Willowgrove is a primarily residential neighbourhood located in the eastside of Saskatoon, Saskatchewan, Canada. It comprises a mix of mainly single-family detached houses and fewer multiple-unit dwellings. As of 2011, the area is home to 3,973 residents. The neighbourhood is considered a middle to high-income area, with an average family income of $96,002, an average dwelling value of $218,357 and a home ownership rate of 84.8%.

History
The land for Willowgrove was annexed between 1975 and 1984. Residential construction did not start until 2004. The housing stock is mostly composed of single-family detached houses, as well as some multiple-unit condominiums.

Willowgrove was planned as a neighbourhood that centered on a village square. It incorporates features from older neighbourhoods (e.g. Nutana) such as narrow, long lots and back lanes. A system of linear parks connects the various parts of the neighbourhood with green spaces, and provides pedestrian linkages. The village square, still under construction at present, will feature limited commercial development as well as higher density residential housing. The urban design of Willowgrove reflect some of the concepts of New Urbanism and the urban village.

As with most Saskatoon neighbourhoods, street names honour various notables in the city's history. A number of names previously assigned to streets in Marquis Industrial prior to a reconfiguration of that region, were reassigned to streets in Willowgrove, such as Thode, Van Impe and Greaves.

Government and politics
Willowgrove exists within the federal electoral district of Saskatoon—University. It is currently represented by Corey Tochor of the Conservative Party of Canada, first elected in 2019.

Provincially, the area is within the constituency of Saskatoon Willowgrove. It is currently represented by Ken Cheveldayoff of the Saskatchewan Party, first elected in 2003.

In Saskatoon's non-partisan municipal politics, Willowgrove lies within ward 10. It is currently represented by Zach Jeffries, first elected in 2012.

Institutions

Education

Planning to build schools in Willowgrove began in 2007. Land was allocated for the construction of schools and a multi-use community centre at the corner of Willowgrove Boulevard and Stensrud Road. On March 18, 2010, the provincial government announced funding for the construction of a joint public/separate school building. Construction began in April 2013 and was completed behind schedule in March 2015.

 Holy Family Catholic School - separate (Catholic) elementary, part of Greater Saskatoon Catholic Schools.
 Willowgrove School - public elementary, part of the Saskatoon Public School Division

Parks and recreation

 Wallace Park 
 Kusch Park 
 Foster Park 
 John Duerkop Park 
 Varley Park 
 William Sarjeant Park 
 Rouillard Park 
 Willowgrove Square 
 Genereux Park 
 Kershaw Park 

The Willowgrove/University Heights community association works to provide activities to promote quality of life and a sense of community for all residents.

Commercial
Willowgrove has limited commercial development centered on its "village square" or home based business. The area's main commercial needs are met by businesses in the neighbouring University Heights Suburban Centre.

Location
Willowgrove is located within the University Heights Suburban Development Area and is located at the eastern edge of the city limits.  It is bounded by McOrmond Drive to the west, Highway 5 to the south, an arbitrary boundary to the north and Holmwood SDA, Saskatoon (annexed from R.M. of Corman Park) to the east. Roads are laid out in a modern system of local roads and collector roads connecting to the primary arterial road (McOrmond Drive). To the north and east, farmland maintained by the University of Saskatchewan provides greenbelt separation from other current and future neighbourhoods in the region.

References

External links

Services/PlanningDevelopment/Documents/Research/Neighbourhood_profiles/2012/Willowgrove.pdf Willowgrove neighbourhood profile 2012
Willowgrove/University Heights Community Association

Neighbourhoods in Saskatoon